Rukinzo Football Club is a football club based in Kigali, Burundi. The club currently plays in the first division, Burundi Ligue A.

History 
It was founded in the capital Bujumbura as the representative team of the national police, so the majority of its payroll is made up of serving officers. In the 2017/18 season, they were promoted to the Burundi First Division for the first time after winning their group in the second category. 

In their first season in the first division, they finished in sixth place and reached the final of the Burundi Cup for the first time, which they lost against Aigle Noir Makamba FC, a team that ultimately won the league and cup that season. 

Being a finalist in the Burundi Cup, Rukinzo qualified for the 2019-20 CAF Confederation Cup, his first international tournament, where they were eliminated in the preliminary round by Triangle United FC from Zimbabwe.

Colours and badge 
Rukinzo FC's colors are Blue and Green

The Rukinzo FC badge has a bow, shield and a policeman in a blue beret.

Stadium 
Rukinzo FC play their home matches at the Stade Intwari

Squad

Management and staff

Honours

Participation in CAF Competitions

References

External links 
 

Football clubs in Burundi
Association football clubs established in 2015